Census-designated places (CDPs) are unincorporated communities lacking elected municipal officers and boundaries with legal status. Since Tucker and Brookhaven (North Atlanta CDP) incorporated after the 2010 Census, Georgia (U.S. state) has 87 census designated places as of 2017.

Census-Designated Places

References

Georgia (U.S. state)